Wauters Point is an ice-covered point forming the north end of Two Hummock Island in the Palmer Archipelago. Charted by the Belgian Antarctic Expedition, 1897–99, under Gerlache, and named by him for Alphonse Wauters, a supporter of the expedition.

Headlands of the Palmer Archipelago
Two Hummock Island